Marc Weiner (born May 17, 1955) is an American comedian, puppeteer, and actor. He creates and performs with "head puppets", which are live human heads atop small puppet bodies.

Biography
Weiner was born in Queens, New York, to a Jewish family. Weiner had a children's television show Weinerville, which ran on Nickelodeon from 1993–1997, and co-hosted the east-coast portion of the 1994 Nickelodeon Kids' Choice Awards. He was first a street performer who worked with Robin Williams and an improv comic who performed at Comic Strip Live, Catch A Rising Star, and the Comedy Cellar in the late 1970s. In 1981, he was a writer and occasional actor on Saturday Night Live. Around this time, he made an appearance on the Bizarre show with his puppet show Rockin Rocko and Tony.

In 1998, Weiner made a guest appearance as himself in "Terminal", an episode of Cartoon Network/Adult Swim's Space Ghost Coast to Coast.

Since the cancellation of Weinerville, he has provided the voices of several characters on the Nick Jr. shows Dora the Explorer, Go, Diego, Go!, and Dora and Friends: Into the City!, including Map, Fiesta Trio and Swiper the Fox, and starred in the show Wordville, also on Nick Jr. In the UK, he starred in "Trebor Mighty Mints" commercials. Weiner also provided the voice of “The Map” in the 2019 film adaptation Dora and the Lost City of Gold.

Also, on an episode of Ned's Declassified School Survival Guide, Weiner appeared as Ned's substitute teacher from elementary school. On an episode of Brotherly Love, he appeared (as himself) as a client needing the Romans to customize his truck while putting on a small show with his puppets.

Filmography

Dora the Explorer voice of the Fiesta Trio, the Map, and Swiper the Fox

Go Diego Go! voice of Big Dinosaur

Dora and the Lost City of Gold voice of Map (reprised role)

The Magic of Christmas voice of Clark Griswold

Merry Christmas, Evrett voice of Big Man

Christmas with the Penners voice of Rudolph the Red-Nosed Reindeer

Home for the Holidays voice of Clark Griswold

References

Further reading

External links

1955 births
American male voice actors
American male comedians
Living people
People from Queens, New York
Comedians from New York (state)
Jewish American comedians
Orthodox and Hasidic Jewish comedians
21st-century American Jews
Nickelodeon people